David Fogel may refer to:

David B. Fogel (born 1964), American computer scientist
Davy Fogel (born 1945), Northern Irish paramilitary

See also
David Vogel (disambiguation)
Fogel (surname)